Turku Airport , is located in Turku, Finland,  north of the center, in Lentokenttä (Finnish for 'airfield') district in the Maaria-Paattinen ward of Turku. It serves approximately 450,000 passengers per year, being the fourth busiest airport in Finland by the number of passengers (in 2019) and second busiest airport by the amount of cargo tonnes (in 2012). Turku Airport is exclusively operated by the state-owned company Finavia. Among normal operation the airport offers differentiated service specifically designed for low-cost airlines since 2008.

Turku Airport and its surroundings are marketed as LogiCity in hopes to attract logistic companies and manufacturers near the airport.

History

Early years
Turku Airport was Finland's first civilian airport when it was built in Artukainen in 1935, but already in the 1920s there was a water airport on Ruissalo Island. Artukainen served as a main airport of Turku until the new airport was built in the municipality of Rusko in 1955. The location became part of Turku in 1957. A new terminal building was opened in 1978. The runway was upgraded to 2500 m in 1980. An air cargo terminal was opened in 1991 as well as an air cargo plate. Terminal 1 was renovated and enlarged in 1999. In the 1990s, Lufthansa CityLine operated flights to Hamburg and ELK Airways to Tallinn.

Development during the 2000s
A second cargo terminal was opened in 2003 and a second passenger terminal for low-cost airlines in 2008. Wizz Air launched flights to Turku in April 2008 and AirBaltic in July 2009. Wingo xprs operated flights to Stockholm-Bromma in spring 2009 and Jet Air to Gdańsk in 2009–2010.

Development since the 2010s
Norwegian Air Shuttle flew to Stockholm-Arlanda and Flybe Nordic to Tallinn during the winter season 2011–2012. Ryanair operated flights to Brussels-Charleroi, London-Stansted, Málaga and Barcelona-Girona only during the summer season 2012. According to Ryanair the period was very successful but they could not tolerate the raised airport costs of Finavia  and promised to return all routes as soon as the price raise would be withdrawn. During the Ryanair's stay there was a 27% growth on passenger statistics. Turku Airport was closed partially in July 2014 for the renovation of the runway and taxiways. Terminal 1 and the passenger apron were also renovated; Finavia budgeted 14 million euros for the renovations and improvements. However, Scandinavian Airlines flights to Copenhagen, one of the most important destinations operated since 2006, were discontinued after the renovations. This had an immediate impact in passenger volumes.

Terminal 2 was closed and its passenger services migrated to the main terminal due to an oil leakage clean up of a spare power unit in autumn 2014. In June 2015 Finavia announced that the low-cost terminal would be completely demolished and the low-cost concept would be continued in the first floor of main terminal in new premises.

Logicity

Logicity started as a project of Pilot Turku Ltd (founded in 2003) but is now operated by Turku Municipal Property Corporation after the contract with Pilot Turku Ltd ended in 2010. LogiCity will be a logistic hub built around Turku Airport. Logicity is supposed to link the different modes of transportation together. The location is considered ideal due to facts that Turku Airport is just 20 minutes from the sea ports of Turku and Naantali, whose combined values are comparable to the Port of Vuosaari in Helsinki. Both E18 highway to St. Petersburg and E63 to Tampere go via Turku Airport, and also rail transport connection to Russia and China passes by the Logicity area. Pilot Turku describes the Turku Region as "the meeting point of the East, the West and the Nordic countries" and as "the multimodal transport centre of the Nordic Triangle".

Logicity is estimated to create at least 3,000 to 5,000 new jobs. The length of the runway at Turku airport has an option to be upgraded to reach  to meet new demands. There are several plans set for the nearby area: new roads, commercial centres, retail parks, industrial estates, logistic terminals and offices. In fact there is already a big commercial area along with the E18 ring road just few kilometers from the airport. The project is regionally important and many towns near the airport (including Turku) are involved in the project as shareholders of Pilot Turku Ltd e.g. Kaarina, Lieto and Naantali.

Currently in 2015, there are three zoning plans pending in the Logicity area: the northern side of the runway, the railway sites on the east and the industrial zones near the railway.

Airlines and destinations
The following airlines operate regular scheduled and charter flights at Turku Airport:

Statistics

Passengers

* During 2014 the airport was operating only 11 months due to renovation of the runway

Freight and mail

 Finavia has not published Turku Airport's cargo statistics since 2014; 2015–2019 by Eurostat

See also
List of the largest airports in the Nordic countries

References

External links

 Finavia – Turku Airport (official site)
 AIP Finland – Turku Airport
 
 
 Pilot Turku
 Turku Air
 Ground handling services - Inter Handling

Airports in Finland
Airport
Airport
Airport
International airports in Finland